El Rancho is an unincorporated area and census-designated place (CDP) in Platte County, Wyoming, United States. As of the 2020 census, it had a population of 18.

The community is in northern Platte County, on the west side of Interstate 25. Access is from Exit 94 (Wyoming Highway 319).

References 

Populated places in Platte County, Wyoming
Census-designated places in Platte County, Wyoming
Census-designated places in Wyoming